The American Callers Association (ACA) is the second largest association of square dance callers in the United States. ACA is a non-profit organization with headquarters at Muscle Shoals, Alabama.  ACA has members in the United States, Canada, Europe, and New Zealand.

Among other things, the organization provides accredited caller training and affordable BMI/ASCAP licensing and liability insurance for dance events.

See also
Callerlab

Square dance
Dance organizations
Florence–Muscle Shoals metropolitan area